The Lycée Saint-Sernin, also referred to simply as Saint-Sernin, is a public Lycée, located at 3 place Saint-Sernin, in the city center of Toulouse, in front of the Basilica of Saint-Sernin. The current headmaster is Thierry Verger. The high school welcomes around 1,800 students, from high school to Classe préparatoire aux grandes écoles.

It is also classified as a Monument historique for some of its buildings inherited from the Hôtel Dubarry, from the 18th century, and the former Benedictine convent, from the 19th century. Upcoming renovation work will make it possible to rehabilitate these buildings and, possibly, to uncover vestiges of medieval times.

Notable alumni 
 Bigflo & Oli, a French hip-hop duo from Toulouse
 Sarah Kofman, a French philosopher
 Camille Razat, a French actress

References

External links

 Lycée Saint-Sernin (official website)

1884 establishments in France
Education in Toulouse
Educational institutions established in the 1880s